

The 32nd SS Volunteer Grenadier Division "30 Januar" ( was formed in January 1945 from what remained of other units and staff and pupils from SS schools and various other troops. A significant cadre came from Hungarian and Romanian Fascists who had joined the SS, but their numbers are unknown. The division fought as part of the V SS Mountain Corps, on the Oder front, just north of Fürstenberg (now part of Eisenhüttenstadt)  and in the Battle of Berlin. The division was destroyed in the Halbe pocket, but part of the unit surrendered to the Americans at Tangermünde.

Commanders
Johannes Mühlenkamp (30 January 1945 – 5 February 1945)
Joachim Richter (5 February 1945 – 17 February 1945)
Adolf Ax (17 February 1945 – 15 March 1945)
Hans Kempin (15 March 1945 – 8 May 1945)

See also
List of German divisions in World War II
List of Waffen-SS divisions
List of SS personnel

References

Footnotes

Bibliography

32
Infantry divisions of the Waffen-SS
Military units and formations established in 1944
Military units and formations disestablished in 1945